Theta Tau is a professional engineering fraternity. The fraternity has programs to promote the social, academic, and professional development of its members. Today, Theta Tau is the oldest and largest professional engineering fraternity and has a membership of men and women who study engineering in all its various branches on over 100 college campuses.

The fraternity was first founded by four engineering students at the University of Minnesota in Minneapolis, Minnesota as the "Society of Hammer and Tongs" on October 15, 1904. Its founders were Erich J. Schrader, Elwin L. Vinal, William M. Lewis, and Isaac B. Hanks. The Fraternity's Greek letter name “Theta Tau” was formally adopted at the first National Convention at the University of Minnesota in 1911. Since then, over 40,000 members have been initiated.

The Theta Tau Central Office is located in Springfield, Missouri.

Symbols 
The primary symbols of Theta Tau are the Hammer and Tongs, and the gear wheel.

The fraternity's open motto is "Whatsoever thy hand findeth to do, do it with thy might;..." – Ecclesiastes 9:10

The flag of Theta Tau is broken into four quadrants, alternately colored dark red and gold.  In the upper left corner is the crest of Theta Tau.  In the opposing corner are Greek letters  in gold.  There is also an alternate flag that is divided into three parts and colored dark red/gold/dark red. The letters ΘΤ in dark red are found in the center section.

The fraternity's colors are dark red and gold, while its gem is the dark red garnet. The more common pyrope garnet, used in the member's badge, is used based upon color and availability.

The oldest symbol of the fraternity still in use is the coat of arms adopted in 1906. It may only be displayed or worn by members.

Theta Tau Jewelry 
The official pieces of Theta Tau jewelry are listed below:

Notable alumni 
The following notable alumni of Theta Tau are also members of the "Theta Tau Alumni Hall of Fame":
Henry W. Coil Jr. - Owner of Tilden-Coil Contractors and University of California, Riverside benefactor
Bill Douce – Chairman of Phillips Petroleum
John W.F. "Jack" Dulles – Author and historian
Paul Endacott – Collegiate basketball player and member of the Basketball Hall of Fame
Joe Engle – Astronaut and commander of Space Shuttle Discovery
Harry Figgie Jr. - Author and Chairman of Figgie International
Robert R. Gilruth – First director of NASA's Manned Spacecraft Center, now Lyndon B. Johnson Space Center
John W. Harrelson – Chancellor of North Carolina State University
Samuel Higginbottom – Chairman & President of Rolls-Royce and Columbia University Trustee
Aelred J. Kurtenbach – Co-founder and Chairman of Daktronics Inc.
Curtis LeMay – US Air Force General during World War II
Charles Luckman – President of Lever Brothers, architect, and member of President Truman's Committee on Civil Rights
Charles Morgan – Chairman of Acxiom Corporation
Simon Ramo – Led the development of microwave and ICBM technology
Roger R. Revelle – Scientist and winner of the National Medal of Science
Lloyd Reuss – President of General Motors
Charles E. Spahr- President of Standard Oil of Ohio
James Spann – Weatherman in Birmingham, AL for ABC 33/40
Cliff Stearns – US Congressman from Florida
Maxwell R. Thurman – First four-star officer from NCSU, Vice Chief of Staff of the United States Army from 1983 to 1987, credited with the Army's "Be all you can be" slogan
Robert J. Van de Graaff – Inventor of the Van de Graaff Generator
J.R. Van Pelt – President of Montana Tech, Michigan Tech, and founding director/curator of Chicago's Museum of Science and Industry
Gus Vratsinas – Founder and Chairman of Vratsinas Construction Company
William E. Wickenden – President of Case Western Reserve University and the American Society for Engineering Education

Other notable alumni:
Harry Darby – US Senator from Kansas
Roy Horstmann – Professional Football player, and All-American (Purdue University)
Blake Ragsdale Van Leer – Dean of Engineering at NCSU, President of the Georgia Institute of Technology and a United States Army officer
Marty Jackley – Attorney General of South Dakota
James Rankin - President of South Dakota School of Mines and Technology

History

Founding years (1904–1911) 

Its Founders were:
 Erich Julius Schrader
 Elwin Leroy Vinal
 William Murray Lewis
 Isaac Baker Hanks

These four were mining engineering students at the University of Minnesota. They agreed that character qualifications should have top priority in membership selection. Schrader created one the original artifacts of incorporation for the Society of Hammer and Tongs, the bolt of "strength and unity" in late 1904. Fabricated of brass and painted the historic dark red found in the official crest. This bolt has survived almost unscathed over the years. Safe keeping this historic object is a sacred trust currently carried out by Brother Joseph Capek of Phi chapter.

Its principal founder, Erich Schrader, wanted to establish a fraternity similar to those already existing in law, medicine, and dentistry. Schrader established a record of service and served as its first Grand Regent until 1919 and then for 35 years as Grand Scribe. At its Founders' Golden Anniversary Convention (1954), Theta Tau established the position of Counselor which only he could hold. His continued to serve until his death in 1962 at the age of 81. The other founders also maintained interest in the fraternity throughout their lives. The last, Vinal, died in 1971.

Schrader was chiefly responsible for the Ritual, Constitution, and the Bylaws adopted by the founders. The constitution provided for the establishment of additional chapters at other leading engineering schools, and the fraternity soon began to expand nationally. Hanks spoke of the fraternity to his friend, Robert Downing, a member of the Rhombohedron Club at Michigan College of Mines; after correspondence and an inspection trip by Hanks, the club (established in 1903) was installed as Beta chapter in 1906. Lewis transferred to the Colorado School of Mines and contacted the Square Set Club, which became Gamma chapter in 1907. The Southwestern Alumni Association, the fraternity's first, was established in Douglas, Arizona, in 1908.

In 1911, representatives of the three chapters and the alumni association met at the University of Minnesota for the first national convention. The name was changed to Theta Tau, a revised ritual was approved, and the present badge was adopted. Perhaps most important for its future expansion, they decided that Theta Tau would include all branches of engineering.

Pre-World War II growth (1911–1935) 
In the next two years, Delta, Epsilon, Zeta, and Eta chapters were installed. The second convention was held in Houghton, Michigan, in 1913. That Convention designated The Gear of Theta Tau as the national fraternity's magazine and appointed Jack E. Haynes, A '08, as its first editor-in-chief. Previously, the magazine had been published by Beta chapter with Herman H. Hopkins, B '08, as editor. Hopkins, a member of the Rhombohedron Club, had been initiated by Beta chapter as an alumnus. He served until 1919 as the Grand Scribe and later (1935) was elected Grand Regent.

The third (1915) and fourth (1919) conventions were held in Cleveland, Ohio. Meanwhile, Theta, Iota, and Kappa chapters were installed. Elected as Grand Regent in 1919 was Dr. George D. Louderback, E '96, a charter member of Epsilon chapter. During his tenure, rapid growth continued, with nine more chapters being installed.

J. Sidney Marine, H '21, was elected Grand Regent in 1925, the youngest to serve in that position. In 1926, Donald D. Curtis, O Hon. '19, was appointed editor. He reorganized the magazine and established membership files still in use. He later (1950–1952) served as Grand Regent.

Three more chapters were installed during the terms of Grand Regent Dr. Richard J. Russell, E '19. He designed and issued the first 5,000 membership certificates and also designed the officer robes.

Joseph W. Howe, O '24, and Paul L. Mercer, O '21, became Editors of The Gear in 1929 and for 32 years diligently maintained regular semiannual publication despite economic conditions.

Fred Coffman, L '22, served as Grand Regent during the depression years through 1935. Despite the conditions, three more chapters were installed. A period of very conservative extension began during the thirties with charters generally being granted only to petitioning long-established locals.

World War II history (1935–1944) 
Regional Conferences were established during Hopkins' term as Grand Regent (1935–37). Dr. John M. Daniels, N Hon. '22, was the last to serve out his term as Grand Regent in the pre-World War II period. At the 1939 convention, Russell G. Glass, S '24, the first of two charter members of Sigma chapter to serve in the Fraternity's top position, was elected Grand Regent and reelected in 1941. In 1940, Grand Regent Glass made a nationwide tour visiting nearly every chapter and many alumni associations. At the 1941 Convention, Theta Tau began a tradition of honoring a student chapter delegate as the convention's "Outstanding Delegate."

During World War II, conventions were discontinued and chapters decreased in size, but few went inactive. Brother Hopkins was named Acting Grand Regent for the 27-month period that Grand Regent Glass served abroad in the Navy. When conventions were resumed in 1946, Ralph W. Nusser, Z '28, was elected Grand Regent. During his term, the chapters grew unusually large due to the influx of returning veterans. Norman B. Ames, GB '17, the charter member responsible for Gamma Beta chapter's affiliation with Theta Tau, was elected Grand Regent in 1948. He was later to succeed founder Schrader as Grand Scribe.

Post World War II (1944–1962) 
Donald D. Curtis, who a few months after his initiation into the fraternity had been appointed Editor in 1926, added to his years of continuous service as a national officer and began his term as Grand Regent in 1950. Another longtime officer, Jamison Vawter, Z '16, was elected Grand Regent for the term concluding Theta Tau's first half century. He had served for 27 years as Grand Treasurer and was honored by being the first for whom a Theta Tau Convention was named (1935).

The Founders' Golden Anniversary Convention was held in Minneapolis and was scheduled to include Founders' Day. It was a gala occasion marred only by the absence of founder Schrader and Editor Howe due to illness. It was attended by founders Lewis and Vinal and by many Past Grand Regents, including brother Louderback.

A. Dexter Hinckley, T '25, was elected Grand Regent at the 1954 Convention. During his first term, Brother Ames, newly elected Grand Scribe, resigned to accept a Fulbright Lectureship in Ceylon (now Sri Lanka). On his return, he visited schools as Special Representative of the Executive Council to promote extension. The position of Regional Director was established by the 1956 Convention.

At the 1958 Convention, Charles W. Britzius, A '33, was elected Grand Regent, the restriction of membership to those who were white was removed, and the Fraternity appropriated funds to support extension efforts.

Robert E. Pope, Z '52, was appointed Grand Scribe in April 1956 to succeed Ames, was repeatedly elected to that office for 38 years, and was first employed by the fraternity as Travelling Secretary in October, 1959.

William E. Franklin, Z '57, then assistant editor, was appointed editor-in-chief of The Gear in 1961, succeeding Howe and Mercer. He served until 1969.

Vietnam years (1962–1976) 
At the convention in 1962, William K. Rey, M '45, was elected Grand Regent, and the fraternity established the position of Executive Secretary (now Executive Director) to which Pope was appointed. In 1963, for the first time, the fraternity had a central office. Britzius, retiring as Grand Regent, was elected Grand Treasurer, a position he was to hold for twelve years. The decade of the 1960s was one of moderate growth with seven new chapters installed. Annual alumni gifts, now so important to the fraternity, were first solicited in 1964.

The convention in 1964 adopted the colony program as the standard route which a local fraternity would follow in becoming a Theta Tau Chapter. It also adopted the official flag featuring four quadrants – dark red in upper left with the coat of arms and lower right with stepped gold letters . The other two quadrants are gold.

The four items of official jewelry remain the member's badge, gear pin (called "sister pin" until 1994), pledge insignia, and official recognition button. Other insignia have been adopted over the years. The colony program sparked design of the simple colony pin, and colony pledge pin, and contributed to adoption of an alternative flag divided along its length into three equal sections, the left and right dark red with gold in the center bearing dark red letters  and  arranged vertically. Other jewelry items are the Greek letter and coat of arms recognition buttons, alumni charm, and Greek letter lavaliere. The coat of arms is also available as a tie tac, in "Founders' size," on a ring, cuff links, and the "annual award key." Available since 1989 is the identification pin displaying the crest (hand grasping hammer and tongs) and gear wheels with the member's name, chapter, and year engraved on its face. To this may be attached an engraved bar for each Theta Tau national meeting attended by the member.

The 1966 Convention elected C. Ramond Hanes, '24, another Sigma charter member, as Grand Regent. The 1968 Convention elected Dr. Charles E. Wales, '53, an Epsilon Beta charter member, as Grand Regent. The position of Student Member of the Executive Council was created in 1970.

The Executive Council Bulletin, in newsletter format, was first published during the 1970–72 biennium. Now generally issued monthly during the school year, it provides timely news and reminders to officers of the national Fraternity, chapters, and alumni organizations.

F. Garn Hatch, ZB '56, edited the Fall 1970, issue of The Gear, the first issue with 8-1/2x11-inch page size. He was succeeded by James M. Walter, Φ '68, who served through 1975, and then Steven A. Williams, ΛΒ '73, editor-in-chief, through 1977. During this period the page size returned to 7x10 inches.

Dr. George G. Dodd, Z '60, was elected Grand Regent in 1972; and the Delegate-at-Large (immediate Past Grand Regent) was made officially a member of the Executive Council. The 1976 Convention elected as Grand Regent Stephen J. Barth, LB '67, a charter member of Lambda Beta chapter, the first second-generation Theta Tau to hold this position. In 1977, a plan adopted by the 1976 Convention was implemented, making women eligible for membership with Delta chapter at Case Western Reserve, being one of the first to actually admit women.

A new era (1976–1991) 
Returning to the tradition of editors-in-chief from Omicron chapter, Richard A. Rummelhart, O '76, was appointed to this position in 1978 and was succeeded by Arthur T. Petrzelka, O '79, who edited the magazine 1979–88. With the Spring, 1979, issue, The Gear adopted the standard 8-1/2x11-inch page size which has been continued.

The first membership directory in forty years was published in 1979, and others in 1985, 1990, and 1994. A History of Theta Tau, compiled by Past Grand Regent Charles W. Britzius, was published in 1980. Regional Conferences were replaced by a special Convention in 1981, establishing the pattern of holding national meetings annually in August rather than biennially in the week after Christmas.

In 1982, A. Thomas Brown, M '77, like Brother Barth, a member's son, was elected Grand Regent. During 1983, Theta Tau purchased its first computer; moved the central office from the Executive Secretary's home to space in the Theta Xi Memorial Headquarters Building in the St. Louis suburb of Creve Coeur; held its first National Conference; and first employed a second member, Dean W. Bettinger, T '81, as Extension Director/Chapter Consultant. Since then, others have been employed for limited periods, including Michael T. Abraham, EB '92, who served as administrative assistant in 1988 and briefly in 1989.

The Theta Tau Alumni Hall of Fame was established in 1986 to honor those members of the Fraternity who have distinguished themselves through the excellence of their contributions to their professions and/or to the fraternity. A chapter or the Executive Council may nominate no more than two annually. From among the nominees, the Selection Committee may name no more than five to be inducted at the national meeting each year. Beginning with the founders, a total of sixty-three have been inducted over the years (twenty-one of them posthumously). Each laureate is presented with a plaque, and their name is engraved on a large plaque displayed in the central office and at each national meeting.

Randall J. Scheetz, O '79, was first elected Grand Regent in 1986. The fraternity experienced significant growth during his tenure with the installation of eight chapters and the certification of thirteen colonies. This extension effort was sparked by Jerome R. Palardy, EB '90, (then Student Member of the Executive Council) in the Detroit area (Xi Beta, Omicron Beta, and Phi Beta Chapters resulting, the latter installed in 1991). Highlighting extension at other schools was the reestablishment of Pi and Gamma Beta chapters (inactive since the late 1970s). Other chapters installed were Pi Beta, Rho Beta, Sigma Beta, and Tau Beta; and four new alumni clubs were authorized.

The Rube Goldberg Machine Contest originated at Purdue University in 1949 as a competition between Phi chapter of Theta Tau and Triangle held annually until 1956. Phi Chapter revived the contest in 1983 as a competition open to all Purdue students. From 1988 to 2013, the Theta Tau Rube Goldberg Machine Contest was a national competition held at Purdue University in March each year with participation by winning entries from local competitions sponsored by Theta Tau Chapters across the nation. The national contest gained much coverage by the press and television media.

Sean Donnelly, T'88, and Lawrence El-Hindi, T '87, were appointed co-editors-in-chief of The Gear of Theta Tau in 1988. At the direction of the Executive Council, the Central Office staff assumed responsibility for the regular publication of the magazine beginning with the Spring 1994, issue. In 1996, the Executive Council appointed as the Board of Editors, Robert E. Pope, editor-in-chief, and Michael T. Abraham. Although it had remained nominally a semiannual periodical, for a variety of reasons its publication had sometimes been irregular during the previous quarter century.

Dean W. Bettinger, who had served as a staff member in 1983, was first elected Grand Regent at the 1990 Convention and subsequently reelected in 1992 and 1994. During his tenure, nine chapters were installed: Upsilon Beta, Phi Beta, Chi Beta, Psi Beta, Tau (reestablished), Omega Beta, Delta Gamma, Epsilon Gamma, and Zeta Gamma; and six colonies certified.

The Theta Tau Outstanding Student Member Program was created in 1991 so each chapter could designate an outstanding student member for recognition by the national fraternity. The criterion for selection is service to the fraternity (at any level) during the previous calendar year. The national fraternity provides an engrossed certificate and an award dangle which the recipient displays on their badge's guard chain. One of these each year is selected as the fraternity's Outstanding Student Member with the announcement made at the national meeting. The national honoree is presented with a special certificate and with a jeweled dangle.

The present day (1991-present) 
In 1991, the central office moved to the 655 Office Building in the Creve Coeur Executive Office Park. Michael T. Abraham returned as a permanent staff member with the title Assistant Executive Director in 1992 and was elected Grand Scribe in 1994. In 1994, the appointive position of Executive Director was added to the Executive Council. Pope, who had served on staff for 37 years, retired in 1996 and was designated Executive Director Emeritus by the Executive Council. Abraham was appointed Executive Director.

Lee C. Haas, Rho '62, was elected Grand Regent in 1996 and reelected in 1998. He was instrumental in establishing the Theta Tau Educational Foundation in 1998 and served as its first President. In 1999 the foundation sponsored the fraternity's first Leadership Academy replacing the National Conference. He presided at the installation of Eta Gamma, Theta Gamma, and Iota Gamma chapters.

At the fraternity's first convention held in Arizona, Glen A. Wilcox, Omega '90, was elected Grand Regent. At the 2000 meeting, many structural changes were made in the constitution and bylaws to more fully integrate the central office into the laws. These changes reflected many practices already in place and allowed the Executive Council to focus on its responsibilities as the fraternity's board of directors. The convention also endorsed the national fraternity liability insurance standard adopted by the Executive Council in the Spring 1999.

In 2000, past Grand Regent Haas presided at the installation of Kappa Gamma chapter at the Virginia Commonwealth University. VCU had begun its engineering school in 1996 with 92 students, and a Theta Tau Colony was established with the assistance of eleven brothers, including Lee Haas and Michael Livingston. Grand Regent Wilcox presided at the installation of Lambda Gamma at Clemson University on January 13, 2001, and he later presided at the installations of Mu Gamma and Nu Gamma in the spring of 2003.

In November 2001, the central office moved from the St. Louis metropolitan area to Austin, Texas, and the fraternity's archives were moved from a room in the Alpha chapter house to the central office.

As the fraternity reached its Centennial in 2004, Theta Tau had initiated over 30,000 members and had more active student chapters than at any time in its history. At the 2004 Convention, Michael D. Livingston, Gamma Beta '92, was elected Grand Regent. During his terms, Omicron Gamma, Pi Gamma, Rho Gamma, Sigma Gamma, Tau Gamma, Upsilon Gamma, Phi Gamma, Chi Gamma, Psi Gamma, Omega Gamma, Zeta Delta, Eta Delta, Theta Delta, and Iota Delta chapters were installed. Additionally, Kappa, Epsilon, Epsilon Delta, and Pi Delta were re-installed/installed as a result of dedicated and persistent efforts of Steven Choi, Zeta '05.

In 2007, the central office moved from leased office space to its first fraternity-owned headquarters. The roughly  office condo is located at the corner of 11th and San Jacinto within blocks of the capitol and university in downtown Austin, Texas. In the same year, the National Alumni Club of Theta Tau was created and work began on keeping interested alumni active and involved in support of the fraternity and the Theta Tau Educational Foundation.

In 2009, Grand Vice Regent Justin G. Wiseman, ΞΒ '95, created Chapter Advisory Teams to provide greater local support for each chapter by utilizing more alumni in support of them. These teams commonly consist of a faculty, house corporation, mature alumni, and recently graduated alumni advisers. In the spring of 2010, Grand Marshal Brandon Satterwhite, Μ '98, led a group of students and alumni on the fraternity's first national service project with the Habitat for Humanity chapter in Bonnell, Florida. Late in 2010, Allison Pollard, ΤΒ '05 (who has served as inGear Editor since 2008) created a Theta Tau Style Guide to counsel chapters on appropriate, proper, and attractive uses of Theta Tau's name, letters, and symbols in print and online.

In late 2010, the Central Office began a major data migration that will enable greater remote oversight and tracking by volunteer leaders. This transition represented the most extensive technological change since 1983 (the first computerization) with less significant changes having been made in 1991 (Unix-based) and 2000 (PC-based). As 2011 began, numerous additional colonies were established.

Local chapter or individual misconduct  
In December 2013, the Michigan Technological University chapter of Theta Tau was suspended for violations of "alcohol, endangerment, community order, disruptive behavior, and hazing provisions." Multiple times during their suspension, they were found to be in violation of alcohol provisions and failing to comply with the terms of their suspension, and as a result were expelled in May 2017.

In April 2018, the Syracuse University chapter of Theta Tau was expelled after the student newspaper published videos of the chapter's members behaving in ways that the university chancellor considered to be "extremely racist, anti-Semitic, homophobic, sexist and hostile to people with disabilities."

Conventions 
The purpose of the biennial National Convention is to bring together brothers from all chapters together to work out the business of the fraternity. Since 1999, the Leadership Academy of the Theta Tau Educational Foundation  has replaced the odd-year national conferences.

Chapters 

Below is a list of the Chapters and Candidate Chapters of Theta Tau. The fraternity has installed 106 chapters at schools throughout the country. For a visual, see the map of chapters.

Chartered Chapters 

* previously inactive.

Certified Candidate Chapters

See also 
Professional fraternities and sororities
Theta Tau Educational Foundation
Rube Goldberg Machine Contest

References 

Student organizations established in 1904
Professional fraternities and sororities in the United States
Professional Fraternity Association
1904 establishments in Minnesota